Aspergillus luppii (also called A. aureofulgens) is a species of fungus in the genus Aspergillus. It is from the Flavipedes section. Aspergillus luppii produces the antimicrobics Curvularin and Dehydrocurvularin.

Growth and morphology

A. luppii has been cultivated on both Czapek yeast extract agar (CYA) plates and Malt Extract Agar Oxoid® (MEAOX) plates. The growth morphology of the colonies can be seen in the pictures below.

References

Further reading
 
 
 

luppii
Fungi described in 1973